The first season of the Indonesian reality talent show The Voice Kids Indonesia premiered in 2016 on Global TV (currently GTV).

Coaches & Host

Coach 
 Agnez Mo
 Bebi Romeo
 Muhammad Tulus

Host 
 Ananda Omesh
 Ersa Mayori

Format

Blind Auditions 
Each contestant is sing on stage where the coach (the jury) sits back to the contestant. In blind audition, the  coach  only judges the contestants of the contestant's voice quality. If  coach  likes the contestant's voice, then  coach  will hit the  I WANT YOU  button which makes the chair rotate towards the stage. Contestants elected by more than one  coach  must choose a  coach  to accompany them to the next round.

Battle Rounds  
Any contestant who has been selected by the same  coach  will be pitted by singing the same song. The  coach then will choose a contestant between other contestants who pitted to be able to continue the next round.

Live Shows  
Each contestant will sing 'live' in front of the  coach  and viewers. In the live shows the entire Indonesian audience will determine which contestants will proceed to the next round through the voting system.

Grand Final 
This round is the final round that will determine the champion of  The Voice Kids Indonesia season 1.

Teams 
Colour key

Blind auditions
Color key:

Episode 1 (August 26)

Episode 2 (September 2)

Episode 3 (September 9)

Episode 4 (September 16)

Episode 5 (23 September)

Episode 6 (30 September)

Episode 7 (7 October)

Episode 8 (14 October)

Battle Rounds 
Colour key

Live Shows 
Color key

Live Show 1

Live Show 2

Semifinals

Finals (December 2)

Final

Grand Final

Elimination Chart

Overall 
Color key
Artist's info

Result details

Team 
Color key
Artist's info

Result details

Contestants who appeared on previous shows
 Jane was on the first season of Indonesian Idol Junior in 2014, but failed to come into spectacular shows 
 Moriet was on the first season of Indonesian Idol Junior in 2014, but was eliminated in Amnesti rounds
 Vavel was on the first season of Indonesian Idol Junior in 2014, but was eliminated in Amnesti rounds
 Sherina was on the first season of La Academia Junior Indonesia in 2014, and was eliminated in Semifinals 
 Keshya was on the first season of La Academia Junior Indonesia in 2014, and was eliminated in top 7
 Shakira was on the first season of La Academia Junior Indonesia in 2014, and was eliminated in top 10
 Alde was on the fifth season of Idola Cilik in 2016 and was eliminated in top 15
 Raja Giannuca was on the fourth season of Indonesia Mencari Bakat 4 in 2014 and was eliminated in top 4

References 

The Voice Indonesia
2016 Indonesian television seasons